Venni Karumbeswarar Temple
is a Hindu temple located at Koilvenni in Tiruvarur district, Tamil Nadu, India. The temple is dedicated to Shiva, as the moolavar presiding deity, in his manifestation as Karumbeswarar. His consort, Parvati, is known as Soundaranayagi. The historical name of the place is Tiruvenni.

Significance 
It is one of the shrines of the 275 Paadal Petra Sthalams - Shiva Sthalams glorified in the early medieval Tevaram poems by Tamil Saivite Nayanars Tirugnanasambandar and 
Tirunavukkarasar. It is also believed that patients suffering from diabetes will be cured of the disease if they make an offering of sugar to the main deity at this temple."Karumbu" in Tamil means sugarcane and the main linga is in the form of a bunch of sugarcane stems tied together.

Gallery

References

External links 
 
 

Shiva temples in Tiruvarur district
Padal Petra Stalam